The Trust for Urban Ecology (TRUE) is a London-based ecological organisation and is part of The Conservation Volunteers (formerly BTCV). The Trust for Urban Ecology was founded in 1976 when ecologist Max Nicholson and a group of like-minded conservationists set up Britain's first urban ecology park.

History
Max Nicholson, the trust's founder, was also instrumental in setting up the World Wildlife Fund and became the 2nd Director General of the Nature Conservancy Council.

The trust's first site, the William Curtis Ecological Park, was created on the site of a derelict lorry park near London's Tower Bridge. The William Curtis Ecological Park was always intended to be temporary and in 1985 the land was returned to its owners. By this time the trust had already created two new nature parks and it would later acquire another two.

Current sites
 Stave Hill Ecological Park    
 Lavender Pond
 Greenwich Peninsula Ecology Park    
 Dulwich Upper Wood

Aims
 To provide a new habitat for urban wildlife
 To enable ecologists to discover more about the nature of urban ecology
 To offer city residents the chance to enjoy nature and learn through hands-on experience
 To demonstrate the value of creative conservation - an ecological approach to the creation of new landscapes
 To provide examples of best practice and key demonstration sites

Other activities
 The trust offer environmental design, creation and management services
 Volunteer and work placement schemes
 Environment skills training
 Corporate team-building projects

See also
 Urban Ecology
 The Conservation Volunteers

References

External links
 Trust for Urban Ecology website
 The Conservation Volunteers website

Environmental organisations based in London
Conservation in the United Kingdom
Organizations established in 1976
1976 establishments in England
1976 in London